The San Antonio Zoo is an Association of Zoos and Aquariums-accredited zoo in Midtown San Antonio, Texas, United States. It is located in the city's Brackenridge Park. San Antonio Zoo is a 50+ acre zoo home to over 750 species, some of which are endangered or extinct in the wild, and an annual attendance of more than 1 million. It also runs non-animal attractions, such as the  narrow gauge San Antonio Zoo Eagle train ride, which first opened in 1956.

The Richard Friedrich Aquarium was opened in 1948. It was the only aquarium in the city until SeaWorld San Antonio was opened in 1988.

History
What is now known as the San Antonio Zoo began in 1914 when Colonel George Washington Brackenridge, one of the city's leading citizens, placed bison, deer, monkeys, African lions, and bears on land he had deeded to the city. The land became Brackenridge Park and Golf Course.

The San Antonio Zoo opened two of the first cageless exhibits in the United States in November 1929 that offered visitors views of the animals not available in caged exhibits. The Richard Friedrich Aquarium was dedicated in 1948, and the Hixon Bird House, funded through the efforts of Colonel Frederick C. Hixon, opened in 1966.

The San Antonio Zoo housed the first herd of addra gazelle in captivity in 1969 and continues to be active in the breeding program for this critically endangered species. Due to the former hoofstock quarantine point in San Antonio, the San Antonio Zoo has historically had a wide variety of hoofstock species.

The zoo is involved in breeding a number of endangered species including black rhino, leopard, golden lion tamarin, dama gazelle, Attwater's prairie chicken (housed and bred off-exhibit), black mangabey, African lion, black-footed ferret, Komodo dragon, Andean condor, and Caribbean flamingos.

The zoo opened Phase II of Africa Live in 2010. Phase I, which opened in 2007, brought a new exhibit for hippos with underwater viewing area and one for new Nile crocodiles as well as many other smaller animals. Phase II contains Angolan colobus monkeys, okapi, African hunting dogs, rock hyrax, and various species of birds contained in the second largest aviary in the world.
On June 18, 2013, a two-headed turtle, along with three one-headed turtles hatched. The two-headed turtle was later named Thelma and Louise after the 1991 film. Thelma and Louise later died on July 29, 2014, from unknown causes.

Josh the African lion was permanently transferred to the Birmingham Zoo in April 2022 as part of the Association of Zoos and Aquariums' Species Survival Plan.

Exhibits

Africa Live!

Africa Live! is the San Antonio Zoo's newest exhibit. Consisting of three phases, Africa Live! gives guests a chance to experience Lake Tanganyika and Lake Malawi. Guests can observe the hippopotamus, Nile crocodile, and African cichlids through underwater viewing windows. Also found in Africa Live! are the Angola colobus, okapi, African wild dog, rock hyrax, Wolf's mona monkey, and various species of birds.

Phase III of Africa Live will consist of new or remodeled exhibits for African elephants, zebras, giraffes, and white rhinoceroses.
In November 2015, the zoo opened a remodeled Giraffe exhibit with a feeding station and other animals like zebras and ostriches will move in with them. In February 2019, the zoo opened a remodeled white rhino exhibit with two new females.

African Savanna
African Savanna takes visitors through a rocky, arid expanse, backed by natural limestone walls. African Plains hosts a number of animals including the zebra, ostrich, marabou stork, sitatunga and waterbuck. Visitors may now also feed the giraffes.

African Plains
Right across from the Savanna, visitors can observe the white rhinoceros and guineafowl. Continuing the walk uphill, the zoo displays cheetahs, as well as smaller animals such as the dik-dik, duiker, and bateleur eagle.

Big Cat Valley
Visitors head straight from the Plains to the Valley. As you head back down the hill, you'll come across addaxes, dama gazelles, warthogs, giant anteaters, bush dogs, lions and Sumatran tigers.

Neotropica
Neotropica houses the zoo's South American plants and animals. The zoo's main waterway makes up a large portion of Amazonia.

The jaguar habitat is located within Amazonia. The exhibit is also home to New World monkeys including golden lion tamarins, golden-headed lion tamarins, Panamanian white-faced capuchins, and white-faced sakis. Other animals include yellow anaconda, Cuvier's dwarf caiman, Seba's short-tailed bat, and the king vulture.

Cat Grottos
A cave-like area for visitors to walk through. It houses the zoo's smaller cats, such as a fishing cat, black-footed cats, clouded leopards, and a caracal. Also located here are a few mammals that look similar to cats: ringtail cat, fossa, and a northern treeshrew.

The Grottos
Close to the entrance, this area has several grottos that house the zoo's two bear species: spectacled bear and American black bear as well as the spotted hyena.

Cranes of the World

Asian Forest
Spanning the quarry wall is the zoo's northern white-cheeked gibbon exhibit. With plenty of ropes to swing on, they stay high above, while below a family of Asian small-clawed otters play in the river. Nearby there are also exhibits for the Komodo dragon and a troop of François' langurs.

Hixon Bird House
A fully enclosed circular building, with glass-fronted enclosures displaying a wide variety of bird species from all over the world. In the middle of the rotunda is a small island planted with trees and shrubs, and containing a small pond. The free-flight birds stay here, and sometimes venture out into the open to explore.

Nature Spot
Designed for the kids, where they can explore and discover and also features exhibits for yellow mud turtles, lesser anteaters, nine-banded armadillos, and squirrel monkeys.

Richard Friedrich Aquarium
Opened in 1948, this charming building is home to an array of both freshwater and saltwater animals.

Amphibia
Formerly called Toadally, this building housing the zoo's amphibian collection, including frogs, toads, salamanders, and caecilians.

Species

Mammals

Birds

Reptiles

Amphibians

See also
Brackenridge Park
City of San Antonio
SeaWorld San Antonio

References

External links

Tourist attractions in San Antonio
Zoos in Texas
Buildings and structures in San Antonio
Zoos established in 1914
1914 establishments in Texas